Edoardo Borromeo (3 August 1822 – 30 November 1881) was an Italian Cardinal of the Roman Catholic Church. He was Maestro di Camera to Pius IX and was Cardinal-Deacon of Santi Vito, Modesto e Crescenzio from 1868 to 1878. He was the seventh cardinal to be selected from the Borromeo family.

References

External links
Catholic hierarchy 
www.borromeo.it
 Salvador Miranda, ‘Consistory of March 13’, The Cardinals of the Holy Roman Church: Biographical Dictionary.
 Borromeo Edoardo di Vitaliano <IX> e D’Adda , biography from verbanensia.org.

19th-century Italian cardinals
Cardinals created by Pope Pius IX
1822 births
1881 deaths
Edoardo